Connie Smith Sings Great Sacred Songs is the fourth studio album by American country singer Connie Smith. It was released in June 1966 via RCA Victor Records and contained 12 tracks. It was also her first collection of gospel songs. The project included covers of popular gospel selections including "Father Along" and "Just a Closer Walk with Thee". The disc reached the top 20 of Billboard country albums chart in 1966.

Background, recording and content
Connie Smith launched her career in 1964 with her debut single called "Once a Day", which topped the American country songs chart for eight weeks. With three commercially-successful country music albums, Smith went into RCA Studio B in February 1966 to record her first album of gospel songs. The album was named Connie Smith Sings Great Sacred Songs because Smith wanted to avoid recording songs with gospel-style piano. "The way it turned out was country songs with sacred words and that's why it's called 'Great Sacred Songs'," she told author Colin Escott. Later in her career, Smith would become more religious and record more gospel material. Reflecting on her first gospel project, Smith said, "At that point I'd say I believed in God, but I was not a Christian."

The project was recorded between February 24 and February 28, 1966 with producer Bob Ferguson. A total of twelve tracks comprised the album. The album mainly included covers of gospel selections and hymns. Among these songs was "I Saw a Man", which originally appeared on Johnny Cash's 1959 LP Hymns by Johnny Cash. Also included was Ferguson's self-penned "Wings of a Dove". According to writer Colin Escott, Smith was "the first to sing all three verses" of the song. Also included on the album were the original gospel hymns "Just a Closer Walk with Thee" and "Wayfaring Pilgrim".

Release and reception

Connie Smith Sings Great Sacred Songs was originally released in June 1966 on RCA Victor Records. It was Smith's fourth studio album issued in her career. The disc was first issued as a vinyl LP containing six songs on either side of the record. Decades later, the album was re-issued to digital and streaming sites such as Apple Music. Following its original release, the disc spent 12 weeks on the Billboard magazine Country LP's and peaked at number 19 in October 1966. The album was received positively by Billboard magazine who commented, "The spirit is with her when she does these sides, some of which have Jake Hess and the Imperials, big sellers in the religious field." AllMusic rated the album four out of five possible stars.

Track listings

Vinyl version

Digital version

Personnel
All credits are adapted from the liner notes of Connie Smith Sings Great Sacred Songs.

Musical personnel

 Willie Ackerman – drums
 Anita Carter – background vocals
 Ray Edenton – guitar
 Dolores Edgin – background vocals
 Jake Hess – background vocals
 Roy Huskey – bass
 Millie Kirkham – background vocals
 Jimmy Lance – guitar
 Gary McSpadden – background vocals
 Leonard Miller – drums
 Armond Morales – background vocals

 Weldon Myrick – steel guitar
 Charles Nelsen – background vocals
 Dean Porter – guitar
 Hargus "Pig" Robbins – piano
 Henry Slaughter – harpsichord
 Connie Smith – lead vocals
 Jerry Smith – organ, vibes
 Gordon Stokey – background vocals
 Pete Wade – guitar
 Raymond Walker – background vocals

Chart performance

Release history

References 

1966 albums
Connie Smith albums
RCA Victor albums
Albums produced by Bob Ferguson (music)
Gospel albums by American artists